Conjugal rights may refer to:
Rights in marriage, related to conjugal responsibilities
Conjugal visits
 Restitution of conjugal rights